is a complex in Minato Mirai 21, Yokohama, Kanagawa Prefecture, Japan. Dedicated to Takashi Yanase's popular Anpanman franchise. It is one of five such complexes in Japan (the others being in Kobe, Sendai, Nagoya and Fukuoka).

In 2019, this facility moved to the neighborhood, removed "& Mall" from the facility name and renamed it "Yokohama Anpanman Children's Museum".

External links 

 

Museums in Yokohama
Anpanman
Children's museums in Japan
Minato Mirai 21